The men's T52 100 metres competition of the athletics events at the 2015 Parapan American Games was held on August 11 at the CIBC Athletics Stadium. The defending Parapan American Games champion was Salvador Hernandez Mondragon of Mexico.

Records
Prior to this competition, the existing records were as follows:

T51

T52

Schedule
All times are Central Standard Time (UTC-6).

Results
All times are shown in seconds.

Final
All athletes are classified as T52 unless indicated.
Wind +3.7 m/s

References

Athletics at the 2015 Parapan American Games